National Napalm Syndicate is a Finnish thrash metal band from Pudasjärvi. The band was formed in 1986.

Band members
Vesa Mänty - vocals (2020-)
Jukka Kyrö - guitar (1986-91, 2002-)
Ville Hanhisuanto - drums (2016-)
Harri Lampinen - guitar (2012-)
Niko Karppinen - bass (2013-)

Discography
Albums:
National Napalm Syndicate
Creatures from the North
Resurrection of the Wicked
Birth, Death And Resurrection (Best of)
Devolution Of Species
Time Is The Fire
The New Hell

Finnish thrash metal musical groups
Finnish musical groups
Musical groups established in 1986
1986 establishments in Finland